Sextus Anicius Faustus Paulinus may refer to:

 Sextus Anicius Faustus Paulinus (consul 298), Roman consul in 298
 Sextus Anicius Faustus Paulinus (consul 325), Roman consul in 325